Hans-Joachim Lange (born 2 August 1940) is a German sailor. He competed in the Star event at the 1972 Summer Olympics.

References

External links
 

1940 births
Living people
German male sailors (sport)
Olympic sailors of East Germany
Sailors at the 1972 Summer Olympics – Star
Sportspeople from Brandenburg